For the former U.S. Army training camp in Texas, see Fort Travis

Camp Travis is an unincorporated community in Clay County, Illinois, United States.

References

Unincorporated communities in Clay County, Illinois
Unincorporated communities in Illinois